The Nvidia NV1, manufactured by SGS-Thomson Microelectronics under the model name STG2000, was a multimedia PCI card announced in May 1995 and released in November 1995. It was sold to retail by Diamond as the Diamond Edge 3D.

The NV1 featured a complete 2D/3D graphics core based upon quadratic texture mapping, VRAM or FPM DRAM memory, an integrated 32-channel 350 MIPS playback-only sound card, and a Sega Saturn compatible joypad port. As such, it was intended to replace the 2D graphics card, Sound Blaster-compatible audio systems, and 15-pin joystick ports, then prevalent on IBM PC compatibles.

Putting all of this functionality on a single card led to significant compromises, and the NV1 was not very successful in the market. A modified version, the NV2, was developed in partnership with Sega for the Sega Dreamcast, but ultimately dropped. Nvidia's next stand-alone product, the RIVA 128, focussed entirely on 2D and 3D performance and was much more successful.

History 

Several Sega Saturn games were converted to NV1-compatible formats on the PC such as Panzer Dragoon and Virtua Fighter Remix. However, the NV1 struggled in a market place full of several competing proprietary standards, and was marginalized by emerging Triangle polygon-based 2D/3D accelerators such as the low-cost S3 Graphics ViRGE, Matrox Mystique, ATI Rage, and Rendition Vérité V1000 among other early entrants. It ultimately did not sell well, despite being a promising and interesting device.

NV1's biggest initial problem was its cost and overall quality. Although it offered credible 3D performance, its use of quadratic surfaces was anything but popular, and was quite different than typical polygon rendering. The audio portion of the card received merely acceptable reviews, with the General MIDI receiving lukewarm responses at best (a critical component at the time due to the superior sound quality produced by competing products). The Sega Saturn console was a market failure compared to Sony's PlayStation or Sega's earlier Sega Genesis, and so the unique and somewhat limiting support of these gamepads was of limited benefit. Nvidia, by integrating all of these usually separate components, raised their costs considerably above what they would have been if the card had been designed solely for 3D acceleration.

During the NV1's release timeframe, the transition from VLB/ISA (486s) to PCI (Pentiums and late model 486 boards) was taking place, and games often used MIDI for music because PCs were still generally incapable of large-scale digital audio playback due to storage and processing power limitations. Reaching for the best music and sound quality, and flexibility with MS-DOS audio standards, often required 2 sound cards be used, or a sound card with a MIDI daughtercard connector. Additionally, NV1's 2D speed and quality were not competitive with many of the high-end systems available at the time, especially the critical-for-games DOS graphics speed. Many customers were simply not interested in replacing their often-elaborate system setups with an expensive all-in-one board and so the heavy integration of NV1 hurt sales simply through inconvenience.

Market interest in the product quickly ended when Microsoft announced the DirectX specifications, based upon triangle polygon rendering. This release by Microsoft of a major industry-backed API that was generally incompatible with NV1 ended Nvidia's hopes of market leadership immediately. While demos of quadratic rendered round spheres looked good, experience had proved working with quadratic texture maps was extremely difficult. Even calculating simple routines was problematic. Nvidia did manage to put together limited Direct3D support, but it was slow and buggy (software-based), and no match for the native triangle polygon hardware on the market.

Subsequent NV1 quadratic-related development continued internally as the NV2.

NV2
Cancelled before completion, NV2 was to be NVIDIA's second PC 3D accelerator graphics chip.

A successor to the NV1, NV2 built upon its predecessor's unusual quadratic 3D-rendering architecture.  It was initially considered for use in Sega's Dreamcast console, due to the relationship cultivated between NVidia and Sega over the porting of Sega arcade and Saturn console titles over to the PC platform, where the similarity in NV1's and Saturn's 3D-rendering architecture aided in the porting process. (The NV1 graphics cards had 2 Sega Saturn gamepad ports integrated so that Saturn titles could be easily ported over to the NV1 cards and have an equal gameplay experience.)  However, experience with both Saturn and NV1's 3D-rendering architecture in the Saturn ultimately led the company to abandon quadratic 3D-rendering architecture altogether, in favor of a more traditional architecture that operated on triangle primitives.

NVIDIA's strong desire to stick with their maturing quadratic forward texture mapping technology was a great cause of friction between Sega and NVIDIA.  One part of the equation was undoubtedly that Sega's PC games division.   A quadratic 3D game engine would be very difficult to port over to just about any other contemporary 3D graphics hardware, all of which used triangle primitives and inverse-texture mapping.   More importantly, although consumer 3D hardware was still in its infancy, there was general consensus within the industry that triangle primitives with inverse-texture mapping would be standard going forward.  Sega ultimately selected NEC/VideoLogic's PowerVR2 to power the 3d-graphics in its Dreamcast console.

Because the demand was not there from Sega, and the PC market had drastically changed direction away from QTM due to the popularity of the triangle polygon-based OpenGL and DirectX, NVIDIA abandoned further development of the NV2 and started on a new architecture, a.k.a. "NV3" or RIVA 128.

3D games that supported NV1 

 Battle Arena Toshinden
 Daytona USA (Japanese releases)
 Descent: Destination Saturn
 NASCAR Racing
 Panzer Dragoon
 Sonic X-treme (cancelled)
 Twisted Metal (Japanese releases)
 Virtua Fighter Remix
 Virtua Cop

References

Computer-related introductions in 1995
Nvidia graphics processors
Sega Saturn
Graphics cards